William Fruet (born January 1, 1933) is a Canadian film and television director, playwright and screenwriter. He made his directorial debut with the drama Wedding in White (1972), based on a play he had also written. The film won Best Picture at the Canadian Film Awards in 1973.

His later career included several horror films, including Death Weekend (1972), Cries in the Night (1980), and Killer Party (1986), as well as television series, including Goosebumps and Poltergeist: The Legacy. Other writing credits include the influential Canadian film Goin' Down the Road, which he co-wrote with Donald Shebib.

Career
Fruet began his career as a writer after attending the Canadian Theatre School. His screenwriting credits include Rip-Off, Wedding in White, Slipstream, Death Weekend, Spasms and Imaginary Playmate, while his film directing credits include Wedding in White, Death Weekend, Spasms, Search and Destroy, Killer Party, Cries in the Night and Bedroom Eyes. Wedding in White, his 1972 film debut starring Carol Kane and Donald Pleasence, was based on a stage play he had written, and won the Canadian Film Award for Best Picture in 1973.

His television credits include episodes of The Ray Bradbury Theatre, My Secret Identity, Diamonds, Alfred Hitchcock Presents, Friday the 13th, War of the Worlds, Counterstrike, The Outer Limits, Goosebumps, Poltergeist: The Legacy, The Zack Files, Da Vinci's Inquest, Chasing Rainbows, Code Name: Eternity and Zoe Busiek: Wild Card.

Prior to his career as a writer and director, Fruet also had an acting role in the 1963 film Drylanders.

Filmography

Directing

References

External links
 

1933 births
Living people
20th-century Canadian dramatists and playwrights
Film directors from Alberta
Canadian television directors
Canadian male screenwriters
Canadian television writers
Writers from Lethbridge
Canadian male dramatists and playwrights
20th-century Canadian male writers
Canadian male television writers
21st-century Canadian male writers
20th-century Canadian screenwriters
21st-century Canadian screenwriters